Pierluigi Chicca (22 December 1937 – 18 June 2017) was an Italian fencer. He competed at the 1960, 1964 and 1968 Olympics in the individual and team sabre events and won a team bronze medal in 1960 and team silver medals in 1964 and 1968.

References

1937 births
2017 deaths
Italian male fencers
Olympic fencers of Italy
Fencers at the 1960 Summer Olympics
Fencers at the 1964 Summer Olympics
Fencers at the 1968 Summer Olympics
Olympic silver medalists for Italy
Olympic bronze medalists for Italy
Olympic medalists in fencing
Sportspeople from Livorno
Medalists at the 1960 Summer Olympics
Medalists at the 1964 Summer Olympics
Medalists at the 1968 Summer Olympics